Dr Malini Bhattacharya is an Indian politician belonging to the Communist Party of India (Marxist). She was elected to the Lok Sabha, lower house of the Parliament of India from  Jadavpur, West Bengal

An author, scholar, translator, playwright and activist in the women's movement, she is a retired Professor of English and former Director, School of Women's Studies, Jadavpur University.

References

External links
 Official biographical sketch in Parliament of India website

1943 births
India MPs 1989–1991
India MPs 1991–1996
Living people
People from Dhaka
People from South 24 Parganas district
Communist Party of India (Marxist) politicians from West Bengal